Omonia Psevda is a Cypriot football team based in Psevdas, Larnaca.

History 
Omonia Psevda FD was founded in 1969 and is the one of the two departments of AC Omonia Psevda.

Until 2017 competed in the Larnaka District Football Association (EPEL). In 2017 it was secured through the inclusion championship the rally in the STOK Elite Division. In the same year win the Championship of STOK Champions. The team won 6 titles in overall, winning all the events in which they participated.

In season 2017–18, the team finished second in the championship winning the promotion in the Third Division. Until the penultimate fixture it was in the first place, but in the last game, the game was a draw and the team went to second place.

Current squad 

For recent transfers, see List of Cypriot football transfers summer 2020.

Honours 

 CFA Integration Championship:
 Winners (1): 2017
 Championship of STOK Champions:
 Winners (1): 2017
 Nikos Zampas Shield:
 Winners (1): 2017
 EPEL Championship:
 Winners (15): 1970–71, 1972–73, 1977–78, 1985–86, 1987–88, 1992–93, 1993–94, 1994–95, 1995–96, 2001–02, 2003–04, 2005–06, 2013–14, 2015–16, 2016–17
 EPEL Cup:
 Winners (5): 1987–88, 2010–11, 2014–15, 2015–16, 2016–17
 EPEL Shield:
 Winners (3): 2011, 2015, 2016

See also 
 Football in Cyprus

References

External links 
 
 

Association football clubs established in 1969
Football clubs in Cyprus
Football clubs in Larnaca
1969 establishments in Cyprus